Raúl Urrutia Ávila (born 1 May 1950) is a Chilean lawyer and politician who served as deputy.

After the profit and corruption scandal of the Universidad del Mar, he resigned to his position as head of that university.

References

External Links
 BCN Profile 

1950 births
Living people 
20th-century Chilean politicians
Pontifical Catholic University of Valparaíso alumni
National Renewal (Chile) politicians
Heads of universities in Chile
People from Viña del Mar
Members of the Chamber of Deputies of Chile